The Shirke, or Shirkhe is a clan (Gotra) of Koli caste and Marathas (a group of several castes who served in Maratha Empire), found largely in Maharashtra and bordering states of India.

History
The Shirke clan held Deshmukhi rights in the areas of coastal Konkan in present day state of Maharashtra and some inland areas of Western Maharashtra during 15th century under the Bahamani Sultanate and in 16th and 17th century under the successor Deccan sultanates of Adilshahi and Nizamshahi During the Bahamani era, the seat of Shirke fief was at Khelna (Vishalgad). The Shirkes intermarried with the Surves and kept command over their regions. In the mid 17th century, Shivaji, the founder of Maratha empire got the Surve and Shirke to join him by force or by forming marital alliances.

The Shirkes were relatives of 17th Bhosale rulers, Shahaji, Shivaji, Sambhaji, and Rajaram.Although Sambhaji's wife came from the Shirke family, his positions were spied upon. Sambhaji and 25 of his advisors were captured by the Mughal forces of Muqarrab Khan in a skirmish at Sangameshwar in February 1689.

The Shirke were relations and confidantes of the Raja Pratapsinha of the short lived Satara state. He also sent a member of the Shirke family to London to plead his case of restoring him to power in 1839.

See also 
 Maratha
 Maratha Empire
 Maratha clan system
 List of Maratha dynasties and states
 Bhonsle
 Gaekwad
 Scindia
 Puars
 Holkar
 Peshwa

References

Further reading 
 

Surnames